Ra'Shad James (born January 26, 1990) is an American professional basketball player who last played for the Birmingham Squadron of the NBA G League. He played college basketball for St. Thomas Aquinas, Iona and Northwood Seahawks.

Early career
After playing high school basketball at White Plains High School, in White Plains, New York, James played two seasons at St. Thomas Aquinas before transferring to Iona for his junior season. He finished his college career at Northwood (Florida) University.

Professional career

Reno Bighorns (2013–2015)
James went undrafted in the 2013 NBA draft. He played his first two professional seasons with Reno Bighorns of the NBA Development League.

Wonju Dongbu Promy (2015)
The 2015–16 season James started with Wonju Dongbu Promy of South Korea, but left the club after appearing in 15 games.

Koszalin (2015–2016)
On November 6, 2015, he signed with AZS Koszalin of Poland. On February 11, 2016, he parted ways with Koszalin.

Westchester Knicks (2016)
On February 23, 2016, he was acquired by the Westchester Knicks.

In July 2016, James joined the Milwaukee Bucks for the 2016 NBA Summer League.

Cedevita Zagreb (2016–2017)
On August 29, 2016, he signed with Cedevita Zagreb of Croatia for the 2016–17 season.

Yeşilgiresun Belediye (2017–2018)
On August 23, 2017, James signed with Turkish club Yeşilgiresun Belediye.

Telekom Baskets Bonn (2018–2019)
In July 2018 he joined the German side Telekom Baskets Bonn on a one-year contract. In 15 Bundesliga games, he led Bonn in scoring with 14.9 points per contest, but parted ways with the club in January 2019.

Ulm (2019)
A couple of days later, he signed with fellow Bundesliga side Ratiopharm Ulm. He appeared in only five Bundesliga games for Ulm (9.2 points, 2.2 assists per contest) due to shoulder injury.

Boulazac (2019)
In July 2019, he was signed by Boulazac Basket Dordogne of the French top-flight LNB Pro A. On August 14, 2019, Boulazac announced that Ra’Shad James will not play for the team next season because he failed physicals and his contract was voided.

Ormanspor (2019–2020)
On November 18, 2019, he has signed with Ormanspor for the Turkish Basketbol Süper Ligi.

Orasì Ravenna (2020–2021)
On July 24, 2020, he has signed with Orasì Ravenna for the Italian Serie A2 Basket.

AS Salé (2021)
In May 2021, James played with AS Salé in the inaugural season of the Basketball Africa League (BAL). He averaged 16.8 points while his team finished as quarterfinalist.

Birmingham Squadron (2021–2022)
On October 25, 2021, James joined the Birmingham Squadron after being acquired from the available player pool.

BAL career statistics

|-
| style="text-align:left;"|2021
| style="text-align:left;"|AS Salé
| 4 || 4 || 34.2 || .482 || .263 || .889 || 6.3 || 1.8 || 1.3 || .0 || 16.8
|-
|- class="sortbottom"
| style="text-align:center;" colspan="2"|Career
| 4 || 4 || 34.2 || .482 || .263 || .889 || 6.3 || 1.8 || 1.3 || .0 || 16.8

References

External links
Euroleague profile
FIBA profile
TBLStat.net Profile

1990 births
Living people
AS Salé (basketball) players
ABA League players
American expatriate basketball people in Croatia
American expatriate basketball people in Morocco
American expatriate basketball people in Poland
American expatriate basketball people in South Korea
American expatriate basketball people in Turkey
American men's basketball players
AZS Koszalin players
Basketball players from New York (state)
Birmingham Squadron players
Boulazac Basket Dordogne players
Iona Gaels men's basketball players
KK Cedevita players
Northwood Timberwolves men's basketball players
People from White Plains, New York
Point guards
Reno Bighorns players
Shooting guards
Sportspeople from Westchester County, New York
St. Thomas Aquinas Spartans men's basketball players
Telekom Baskets Bonn players
Westchester Knicks players
White Plains High School alumni
Wonju DB Promy players
Yeşilgiresun Belediye players
United States men's national basketball team players